William Koskei Chemitei (born 29 December 1970) is a former Kenyan middle-distance runner who won a gold medal at the 1988 World Junior Championships in Sudbury in the 3000 metres steeplechase event.

He represented his country three times in the junior race at the IAAF World Cross Country Championships from 1987 to 1989, finishing in the top six on each occasion and sharing in the team gold in 1988 and 1989.

International competitions

References

1970 births
Living people
Kenyan male long-distance runners
Kenyan male steeplechase runners
Kenyan male cross country runners
World Athletics U20 Championships winners